Henry Ward was an American Negro league first baseman in the 1900s and 1910s.

Ward made his Negro leagues debut in 1908 with the San Antonio Black Bronchos. He went on to play for the West Baden Sprudels in 1912 and 1915.

References

External links
 and Seamheads

Year of birth missing
Year of death missing
Place of birth missing
Place of death missing
San Antonio Black Bronchos players
West Baden Sprudels players
Baseball first basemen